For information on all University of West Florida sports, see West Florida Argonauts

The West Florida Argonauts football program is the intercollegiate American football team for the University of West Florida located in the U.S. state of Florida. The team competes in the NCAA Division II and are members of the Gulf South Conference. West Florida's first football team was fielded in 2016. The team plays its home games at Pen Air Field in Pensacola, Florida. The Argonauts are coached by Kaleb Nobles.

Facilities
Pen Air Field is a stadium located on the campus of the University of West Florida in Pensacola, Florida and the home of the West Florida Argonauts football program. The field was built in February of 2016 and was used mainly for practices for the football team. For the first six years of the program's history, the home games were played at Blue Wahoos Stadium until there was a scheduling conflict with one game in 2021 with Pensacola Blue Wahoos. On February 28, 2022, the university announced that they moved all the home games for the 2022 season to Pen Air Field, in hope to also increase student attendance.

The first game held at Pen Air Field was on September 11, 2021, against Southwest Baptist, where the Argonauts defeated the Bearcats, 63–14. The attendance to the game was 5,463. The university installed portable bleachers, video board, play clocks and fans around the field.

Year-by-year results

References

External links
 

 
American football teams established in 2016
2016 establishments in Florida